Alice Glockner Nature Reserve, in Gauteng, South Africa, is a  nature reserve located south of Suikerbosrand Nature Reserve. The closest town is Heidelberg, Gauteng. It contains several threatened or endangered species including Delosperma macellum and the Heidelberg copper butterfly (Chrysoritis aureus).

The floral wealth of the Alice Glockner is confirmed by the complex grass vegetation and the support of no more than 16 proven plants of significant medicinal value.

References

Gauteng Parks
1973 establishments in South Africa
Protected areas established in 1973